Steve McGowan is a former professional rugby league footballer who played in the 1980s and 1990s.

Playing career

Bradford Northern
McGowan played  in Bradford Northern's 12–12 draw with Castleford in the 1987 Yorkshire Cup Final during the 1987–88 season at Headingley, Leeds on Saturday 17 October 1987, played , in the 11–2 victory over Castleford in the 1987 Yorkshire Cup Final replay during the 1987–88 season at Elland Road, Leeds on Saturday 31 October 1987, and played , in the 20–14 victory over Featherstone Rovers in the 1989 Yorkshire Cup Final during the 1989–90 season at Headingley, Leeds on Sunday 5 November 1989.

McGowan played , in Bradford Northern's 15–8 defeat by Wigan in the 1992–93 Regal Trophy Final during the 1992–93 season at Elland Road, Leeds on Saturday 23 January 1993.

Steve McGowan's Testimonial match at Bradford Northern took place in 1993.

In November 1994, McGowan, along with Bradford teammate Daio Powell, were sold to Wakefield Trinity in exchange for Gary Christie.

References

External links
Photograph "McGowan and Mercer" at rlhp.co.uk
Photograph "1989/90 Team Photo" at rlhp.co.uk
Photograph "New signings" at rlhp.co.uk
Photograph "Steve McGowan receives testimonial cheque from members of the ex-players association" at rlhp.co.uk

1964 births
Living people
Bradford Bulls players
North Sydney Bears players
Place of birth missing (living people)
Wakefield Trinity players
Rugby league centres
English rugby league players